Laureat Arthur "Pit" Pouliot (1890 – May 14, 1935) was a professional ice hockey player. He played with the Quebec Bulldogs of the National Hockey Association.

References

1890 births
1935 deaths
Quebec Bulldogs (NHA) players